Noel Andrew Cressie   is an Australian and American statistician.   He is Distinguished Professor and Director, Centre for Environmental Informatics, at the University of Wollongong in Wollongong (53 miles south of Sydney), Australia.

Education and career 
Cressie studied mathematics at University of Western Australia and the USA, where obtained his Ph.D. in Statistics from Princeton University, USA, advised by Geoffrey S. Watson and taught by both Watson and John W. Tukey.  He has spent the majority of his professional life in the USA as professor and distinguished professor at both Iowa State University and Ohio State University. Since 2012, he has been  professor and distinguished professor at the University of Wollongong, Australia. “A Conversation with Noel Cressie” about statistical science and its evolution in spatial and spatio-temporal statistics was published in 2019.

Research 
Cressie's research lies broadly in data science in the area of environmental informatics, emphasizing uncertainty quantification and using tools from the fields of Statistics, Mathematics, Computing, and Visualization. His main area of application in the 2010s and beyond has been in remote sensing of the environment using spatial and spatio-temporal statistical methodology.

Cressie is best known for having brought disparate statistical methodologies in the early 1990s into a nascent discipline known as Spatial Statistics. In his widely cited book, Statistics for Spatial Data, Cressie established a general spatial model that unified statistics for geostatistical data, regular and irregular lattice data, point patterns, and random sets, building on earlier research of his and many others on statistical theory, methodology, and applications for spatial data. Since the 2000s, this methodology has emphasized hierarchical statistical modeling, which was integrated into two subsequent books, Statistics for Spatio-Temporal Data and Spatio-Temporal Statistics with R. It has been applied in areas of ‘big science,’ such as remote sensing of Earth on a global scale, understanding the global carbon cycle and its effect on climate change, Greenland ice-sheet mass balance, and disease mapping.

Over the course of his statistical career, Cressie has authored or coauthored four books and around 300 articles in scholarly journals and edited volumes. The book, Statistics for Spatio-Temporal Data (2011), by Cressie and Christopher K. Wikle, received two awards: the 2011 PROSE Award in the Mathematics category (for PROfessional and Scholarly Excellence, given by the Association of American Publishers), and the 2013 DeGroot Book Prize (awarded every two years by the International Society for Bayesian Analysis). The book, Spatio-Temporal Statistics with R (2019) by Christopher K. Wikle, Andrew Zammit-Mangion, and Cressie received the 2019 Taylor and Francis Award for Outstanding Reference/Monograph in the Science and Medical category.

Honors and awards 
Cressie's accomplishments have resulted in a number of awards, including Fellow of the American Statistical Association (ASA), Fellow of the Institute of Mathematical Statistics, Fellow of the Spatial Econometrics Association, and Elected Member of the International Statistical Institute. In 2009, he received one of the highest awards in statistical science, the R.A. Fisher Lectureship, from the  Committee of Presidents of Statistical Societies (COPSS). In 2018, Cressie was elected a Fellow of the Australian Academy of Science (FAA) and, in 2020, he was elected a Fellow of the Royal Society of New South Wales (FRSN).

Cressie was awarded the Pitman Medal in 2014 by the Statistical Society of Australia in recognition of his outstanding achievement in, and contribution to, the discipline of Statistics. In 2016, he received the Barnett Award from the Royal Statistical Society for excellence in environmental statistics, and in 2017 he delivered the Georges Matheron Lecture at the International Association for Mathematical Geosciences.

Selected publications 

Goodness-of-Fit Statistics for Discrete Multivariate Data, by Timothy R. C. Read and Noel A. C. Cressie. Springer, New York, NY, 1988 (211 pp.). (doi: 10.1007/978-1-4612-4578-0)    
Statistics for Spatial Data, by Noel A. C. Cressie. Wiley, New York, NY, 1991 (900 pp.). Revised edition: Wiley, New York, NY, 1993 (900 pp.). Paperback edition in the Wiley Classics Library: Wiley, Hoboken, NJ, 2015 (900 pp.). (doi: 10.1002/9781119115151.ch1)  
Statistics for Spatio-Temporal Data, by Noel Cressie and Christopher K. Wikle. Wiley, Hoboken, NJ, 2011 (588 pp.). (ISBN 978-0-471-69274-4)  
Spatio-Temporal Statistics with R, by Christopher K. Wikle, Andrew Zammit-Mangion, and Noel Cressie. Chapman & Hall/CRC, Boca Raton, FL 2019 (380 pp.). (doi: 10.1201/9781351769723)
Cressie, N. (1989). Empirical Bayes estimation of undercount in the Decennial Census. Journal of the American Statistical Association 84, 1033-1044. (doi: 10.1080/01621459.1989.10478869)
Cressie, N. (1990). The origins of kriging. Mathematical Geology 22, 239-252. (doi: 10.1007/bf00889887)
Cressie, N. and Hulting, F. L. (1992). A spatial statistical analysis of tumor growth. Journal of the American Statistical Association 87, 272-283. (doi: 10.1080/01621459.1992.10475206)
Cressie, N. and Huang, H.C. (1999). Classes of nonseparable, spatio-temporal stationary covariance functions. Journal of the American Statistical Association 94, 1330-1340. (Correction: 2001, Vol. 96, p. 784.) (doi: 10.1080/01621459.1999.10473885)
Wikle, C.K. and Cressie, N. (1999). A dimension-reduced approach to space-time Kalman filtering. Biometrika 86, 815-829. (doi: 10.1093/biomet/86.4.815)
Cressie, N. and Johannesson, G. (2008). Fixed rank kriging for very large spatial data sets. Journal of the Royal Statistical Society (Series B) 70, 209-226. (doi: 10.1111/j.1467-9868.2007.00633.x)
Cressie, N., Shi, T., and Kang, E.L. (2010). Fixed rank filtering for spatio-temporal data. Journal of Computational and Graphical Statistics 19, 724-745. (doi: 10.1198/jcgs.2010.09051) 
Nguyen, H., Katzfuss, M., Cressie, N., and Braverman, A. (2014). Spatio-temporal data fusion for very large remote sensing datasets. Technometrics 56, 174-185. (doi: 10.1080/00401706.2013.831774)
Cressie, N. and Kang, E.L. (2016). Hot enough for you? A spatial exploratory and inferential analysis of North American climate-change projections. Mathematical Geosciences 48, 107-121. (doi: 10.1007/s11004-015-9607-9)
Cressie, N. (2018). Mission CO2ntrol: A statistical scientist’s role in remote sensing of atmospheric carbon dioxide (with discussion). Journal of the American Statistical Association 113, 152-181. (doi: 10.1080/01621459.2017.1419136)
Cressie, N. (2021). A few statistical principles for data science. Australian and New Zealand Journal of Statistics. (doi: 10.1111/anzs.12324)
Zammit-Mangion, A. and Cressie, N. (2021). FRK: An R package for spatial and spatio-temporal prediction with large datasets. Journal of Statistical Software 98(4), 1-48. (doi: 10.18637/jss.v098.i04)

References

External links
 
 Website

1950 births
Living people
Australian statisticians
Fellows of the American Statistical Association
Fellows of the Australian Academy of Science
Georges Matheron Lectureship recipients
Fellows of the Royal Society of New South Wales
University of Western Australia alumni
Princeton University alumni
Ohio State University faculty
Iowa State University faculty
Academic staff of the University of Wollongong
Spatial statisticians